MP3 was a monthly magazine published by Future plc in the UK. It covered the topic of downloading MP3 digital audio files from the internet. Intended to capitalise on the popularity of the MP3 format and websites such as MP3.com and PeopleSound.com, it offered product reviews, guides, charts and advice. It hoped to carve a niche in an area already covered by other music and computer magazines and offered a cover-mounted compact disc. Advertising space was sold by Future stablemate Computer Music, who shared the same target audience.

References

2000 establishments in the United Kingdom
Defunct computer magazines published in the United Kingdom
Magazines established in 2000
Magazines with year of disestablishment missing
Mass media in Bath, Somerset
Monthly magazines published in the United Kingdom
Music magazines published in the United Kingdom